Lydia Pense (born  Lydia Jane Pense in San Francisco, California on December 14, 1947)  is an American rock-soul-jazz singer who, since 1969, has performed with the band Cold Blood. Critics have compared her style to powerful singers including Janis Joplin and Aretha Franklin.

History 
Lydia Pense was born in San Francisco on December 14, 1947, and lived there until age 10 until the family moved to Redwood City, California. At age 14, while attending Sequoia High School, Pense started singing with a band called The Dimensions, with Guitarist Fred Tatman, Larry Hatch and Kerry Yates.  She was a fan of Brenda Lee and was singing her songs, but the band encouraged her to sing R&B in the style of James Brown, Chuck Berry, Fats Domino, and Ray Charles.

Janis Joplin had recommended Lydia Pense audition for the band Cold Blood to music promoter Bill Graham. Lydia joined Cold Blood in 1968 and the band was one of the earliest music groups to be signed by Bill Graham's Fillmore Records.

The band Cold Blood separated in the late 1970s. Pense suspended her music career in the early 1980s to raise her daughter Danielle, before re-forming the group in 1988. The band continues to record, tour and perform.

Discography
Their initial four albums, Cold Blood, Sisyphus, First Taste of Sin (produced by Donny Hathaway), and Thriller remain their best known work.

Albums

See also 
 Cold Blood

References

External links
Official site for Lydia Pense and Cold Blood
 Chronology of San Francisco Rock in the late 1960s

1947 births
Living people
American dance musicians
American women singers
American rhythm and blues singers
Singers from San Francisco
Jazz musicians from San Francisco
People from Redwood City, California
21st-century American women